Beyond the Cursed Eclipse is the debut album by the American symphonic black metal band Vesperian Sorrow.

Track listing

 "Intro" − 2:22
 "Beyond the Cursed Eclipse" − 8:22
 "Twilight of Azrael" − 7:25
 "From an Ever Blackened Star" − 8:14
 "Calydon" − 7:43
 "Shadowlord" − 5:19
 "Windswept" − 8:44
 "Saga of the Second Sign" − 5:22
 "V S" − 3:46

References

1999 debut albums
Vesperian Sorrow albums